The men's Greco-Roman 59 kilograms is a competition featured at the 2015 World Wrestling Championships, and was held in Las Vegas, United States on 8 September 2015.

Results
Legend
D — Disqualified
F — Won by fall

Finals

Top half

Section 1

Section 2

Bottom half

Section 3

Section 4

Repechage

References
Official website

Men's Greco-Roman 59 kg